The Kwarandji are an indigenous Australian people of the Northern Territory. They speak a dialect of the Mudburra language.

Alternative names
 Kwaranjee.
 Kooringee.
 Coorinji.
 Goarango.
 Gurindji.

Notes

Citations

Sources

Aboriginal peoples of the Northern Territory